The State University of New York at New Paltz (SUNY New Paltz or New Paltz) is a public university in New Paltz, New York. It traces its origins to the New Paltz Classical School, a secondary institution founded in 1828 and reorganized as an academy in 1833.

History

Following a decimating fire in 1884, the New Paltz Classical School offered their land to the state government of New York contingent upon the establishment of a normal school.  In 1885, the New Paltz Normal and Training School was established to prepare teachers to practice their professions in the public schools of New York. It was granted the ability to award baccalaureate degrees in 1938, when it was renamed the State Teachers College at New Paltz; the inaugural class of 112 students graduated in 1942. In 1947, a graduate program in education was established. When the State University of New York was established by legislative act in 1948, the Teachers College at New Paltz was one of 30 colleges associated under SUNY's umbrella. An art education program was added in 1951. In 1960, the college (assigned the moniker of the State University of New York College of Liberal Arts and Science at New Paltz in 1961) was authorized to confer liberal arts degrees.

There were several student-led demonstrations in the late 1960s and early 1970s, primarily against the Vietnam War. In the spring of 1967, a sit-in protesting military recruitment on campus blocked the entrance to the Student Union for two days. While there were scores of demonstrators the first day, all but 13 dispersed before New York State Troopers arrived and bodily carried the demonstrators to a waiting school bus for a trip to court. In the fall of 1968, students rallied in support of Craig Pastor (now Craig DeYong) who had been arrested by New Paltz Village Police for desecration of the American flag which he was wearing as a superhero cape in a student film directed by Edward Falco. College President John J. Neumaier posted bail. Pastor was released and charges were dropped.

The Cambodian Campaign and concomitant Kent State shootings in May 1970 led to a protest that culminated in a five-day student occupation of the Administration Building, subsequently renamed Old Main after the opening of the Haggerty Administration Building two years later. A March 1974 sit-in at the Haggerty Building reacted against perceived discriminatory hiring practices, the state-mandated reintegration of Shango Hall (which then housed underrepresented students), and the threatened cessation of the Experimental Studies Program in the wake of a budget shortfall.

Amid this tumult, the college's general education program (including then-vanguard introductory surveys of African and Asian cultures) was eliminated in 1971; a distribution requirement was re-instituted in 1993. A program in African American studies was established in 1968. Three years later, the Experimental Studies Program (reorganized as the Innovative Studies Program in 1975) began to  enroll students, instructors, and local residents in credited and cocurricular courses that encompassed myriad disciplines, including video art (under Paul Ryan), dance therapy, clowning, camping, and ecodesign. Instructors in the program were hired by students and compensated through student activity fees. A  environmental studies site operated by students and community members under the aegis of the program at the southern periphery of the campus included geodesic domes, windmills, kilns, a solar-powered house funded by the Department of Energy, and more inchoate variants of sustainable architecture. Upon ascending to the college presidency in 1980, Alice Chandler characterized the edifices as "shacks and hovels" and abolished the program in the early 1980s, demolishing most of the site in the process.

Under Chandler's leadership, the college (then known as the State University of New York College of Arts and Science New Paltz) began to offer professional degree programs in nursing, engineering, journalism, and accounting. The Legislative Gazette, a journalism and political science internship in which students live and work in Albany and produce a weekly newspaper about state politics, was established in 1978.

On December 29, 1991, the campus was the scene of a widely reported PCB incident that contaminated four dormitories (Bliss, Gage, Capen and Scudder Halls), as well as the Coykendall Science Building and Parker Theatre. Under the direction of the county and state health departments, the university began a massive, thorough clean-up effort. As an additional precaution, 29 other buildings were thoroughly tested and, if necessary, cleaned. The clean-up process lasted until May 1995. Since 1994, PCBs have not been used on the SUNY New Paltz campus.

The college was rebranded as the State University of New York at New Paltz in 1994.

In November 1997, two events on campus attracted nationwide media attention. The first, a feminist conference on sex and sexuality sponsored by the Women's Studies department entitled "Revolting Behavior: The Challenges of Women's Sexual Freedom", featured an instructional workshop on sex toys offered by a Manhattan sex shop proprietor and a lecture panel on sadomasochism ("Safe, Sane and Consensual S/M: An Alternate Way of Loving"). The second, a seminar entitled "Subject to Desire: Refiguring the Body", was sponsored by the School of Fine and Performing Arts. One presenter, Fluxus performance artist and longtime New Paltz resident Carolee Schneemann, was best known for Interior Scroll (1975), a piece that culminated in her unrolling a scroll from her vagina and reading it to the audience; at the seminar, Schneemann exhibited abstract photographs of her vagina as part of Vulva's Morphia (1995), "a visceral sequence of photographs and text in which a Vulvic personification presents an ironic analysis juxtaposing slides and text to undermine Lacanian semiotics, gender issues, Marxism, the male art establishment, religious and cultural taboos."

Political conservatives were outraged that a public university had hosted such events, and Governor George Pataki and SUNY chancellor Robert King expressed their displeasure. The controversy escalated when the Theatre Arts department staged The Vagina Monologues shortly afterwards. The college's then-president, Roger Bowen, defended freedom of expression on campus and refused to apologize, doing little to allay conservative ire. "The real issue," he said, "is whether some ideologues, however well-intentioned, have the right to dictate what we say and what we do on this campus." SUNY trustee Candace de Russy called for him to be dismissed.  Bowen later resigned.

In 2023, the institution was officially reclassified as a university by the State University of New York. The change took effect January 1, 2023, exactly seventy-five years after the SUNY system was founded; New Paltz was a founding member.

Campus

There are 14 residence halls, centered mostly in two quads. The main campus has two dozen academic buildings, including the Haggerty Administration Building, a lecture hall, Old Main, Sojourner Truth Library, one main dining hall, the Student Union Building, Science Hall and extensive gymnasium and sports areas.

The college also operated the Ashokan campus in Olivebridge, New York, consisting of another . In 2008 it was sold by Campus Auxiliary Services to the Open Space Conservancy; it is now operated as the Ashokan Center.

SUNY New Paltz has undergone extensive construction projects since 2008, totaling nearly $300 million, including:

 Renovation of Hasbrouck Complex Residence Halls (ongoing)
 Student Union Building addition: "The Atrium" (completed fall 2010)
 Old Main renovation (completed spring 2011)
 The Concourse Landscaping/Renovation (completed fall 2011)
 Hasbrouck Quad Landscaping/Renovation (completed fall 2011)
 Construction of Mohonk Walk (completed summer 2012)
 Ridgeview Hall (completed summer 2015)
 Sojourner Truth Library renovation (completed fall 2015)
 Wooster Science Building renovation (completed summer 2016)
 Construction of Science Hall, a new science building (completed winter 2017)
 Engineering Innovation Hub (completed fall 2019)

Campus theaters
SUNY at New Paltz contains three on-campus theaters.

McKenna Theater
McKenna Theatre is a fully equipped proscenium theatre seating 366.  The theater is named in honor of Dr. Rebecca McKenna, professor of English and Drama and  the founder of the theatre arts program at New Paltz.  At the rear of the theater is a sound booth for digital audio equipment which has the capabilities to play back, mix, and amplify audio.  There is also a lighting booth with a computerized light board (controlling over 200 dimmers) and LCD video projection equipment behind the audience (and upstairs).  There are 32 line sets in the fly space above the stage.  There is also a scene shop behind the stage, storage area for scenery, a paint shop, and  other technical facilities.

Parker Theater

The building was originally built as a dining hall.  Parker was then converted to a theatre venue and teaching space. In 1972 it was made into a theatre production facility. The building was renovated in 1994, featuring a modified thrust stage surrounded by a three-quarter audience configuration seating up to 200 people. In the rear are lighting and sound booths with computerized light board (controlling over 90 dimmers) and digital audio equipment.  To both sides of the stage are performance studio spaces. Classes are offered in acting, voice, movement, and musical theatre.  On the same floor of the theater are a costume studio, dressing rooms, costume maintenance, storage facilities, and faculty offices.

Parker Theatre was built in 1962. It houses the Raymond T. Kurdt Theatrical Design Collection, one of the most significant 
collections of original costume and set designs in the nation.

Max and Nadia Shepard Recital Hall
Max and Nadia Shepard Recital Hall resides in College Hall, the oldest residence hall on campus. Built in 1951, it is a landmark, and is the closest hall to the village of New Paltz. Its basement, now used primarily for storage, was built as a fallout shelter, and was stocked as such until the 1980s. The only remaining remnant are the "fallout toilets".

The facility contains 125 seats and is named in honor of patrons of the performing arts programs at SUNY New Paltz. The hall offers a delicate setting for student recitals and chamber music performances. The rear of the hall contains a small studio equipped with Pro-tools HD and a Control 24 sound board used for recording professional performances.

Max and Nadia Shepard Recital Hall is an important facility for the community. It hosts many recitals and is an integral part of the Piano Summer program.

Samuel Dorsky Museum of Art
At the center of campus is the Samuel Dorsky Museum of Art, which opened in 2001. With more than 9,000 square feet of exhibition space in six galleries, the Dorsky is one of the largest art museums in the SUNY system. The East Wing includes the Morgan Anderson Gallery, Howard Greenberg Family Gallery, Sara Bedrick Gallery, and the Corridor Gallery, and the West Wing includes the Alice and Horace Chandler Gallery and the North Gallery. The Dorsky's permanent collection comprises more than 5,000 works of American Art (with emphasis on the Hudson Valley and Catskill Regions), 19th, 20th and 21st century photography, metals, and a "world collection" of art and artifacts dating back to ancient times and representing diverse cultures. Through its collections, exhibitions, and public programs, the Dorsky supports and enriches the academic programs at the college, presents a broad range of world art for study and enjoyment, and serves as a center for Hudson Valley arts and culture. The Dorsky's facilities include research and seminar rooms for visitors, students and professors at SUNY New Paltz.

Also on SUNY New Paltz campus is the Fine Art Building Student Gallery, which features student works.

Student life

Athletics
SUNY New Paltz teams participate as a member of the National Collegiate Athletic Association's Division III. The Hawks are a member of the State University of New York Athletic Conference (SUNYAC). Men's sports include baseball, basketball, cross country, soccer, swimming & diving, volleyball and lacrosse; women's sports include basketball, cross country, field hockey, lacrosse, soccer, softball, swimming & diving, tennis and volleyball.

For the first time in program history, New Paltz men’s volleyball team captured the NCAA Division III Tournament title in 2016. The win also marked the first NCAA title for any New Paltz team. Three years later, they defeated UC Santa Cruz to win their second championship in the sport and second for the school overall.

Greek life
Recognized fraternities and sororities at the university include:

Clubs and traditions

The student governance is operated by the Student Association, which funds most student activities through a mandatory fee. There are many clubs, fraternities, and sororities. Clubs that are recognized by the Student Association are organized into one of six boards: Academic, Advocacy, Athletic, Fine and Performing Arts, Media, and Social and Cultural. There is also an on-campus government, the Residence Hall Student Association (RHSA).

The college has an auxiliary services corporation common to many state campuses in New York, called Campus Auxiliary Services, Inc. (CAS). This on-campus company operates the dining halls and bookstore, as well as being the source of discretionary funds for spending by the college president and the RHSA.

The college has a foundation and an active alumni association.

The college's official student newspaper is The Oracle. In 2010, it was honored by the Society of Professional Journalists for having the Best Affiliated Website for four-year college or university (Region 1 competition). It was named as a runner-up for the National Title.

Among the many clubs and associations on campus is the Nifty Nifflers, a Quidditch team inspired by the fictional sport played in the Harry Potter series.

The campus TV station is WNPC TV. It broadcasts on channels 3, 6 and 8 in the New Paltz area.

The college's radio station, WFNP, is known as "The Edge".  It broadcasts part-time at FM 88.7, and also streams online.  Its public service announcement program is called the "voicebox of the Valley".

Beginning in 2006, "geeky" SUNY New Paltz clubs have run two conventions on campus: "New Paltz Convention" in the Fall and "Conquest" in the Spring. The first year the conventions were run by the Anime, Live Action Role Play, and Gaming clubs on campus. Each year various other "geeky" clubs have taken part. In the 2017-2018 school year, the two conventions were combined into one event, the New Paltz Convention (NPC) in the Spring.

Among the social and cultural clubs is the Asian and Pacific Islander Student Alliance (APISA), which hosts several programs, trips, and events celebrating and spreading Asian culture and history. Some of APISA's yearly traditions include a week-long film festival series focusing on Asian success in the film industry as performers, film directors, and producers, culinary nights where students are invited to learn how to cook Asian foods, and a gala in May to celebrate Asian American and Pacific Islander Heritage Month.

Notable alumni

SUNY New Paltz alumni include: 
 Salvador Agron –  "The Capeman," the main figure from the Broadway show The Capeman
 Michael Badalucco – actor
 Yak Ballz – underground rapper born Yashar Zadeh
 David Bernsley (born 1969), American-Israeli basketball player
 Eleonor Bindman  (born 1965), American pianist, teacher and recording artist
 Rob Borsellino – reporter
 Kevin Cahill – member of the New York State Assembly
 Regina Calcaterra –  author
 Joan Chen – actress
 Scott Cohen – actor
 Murali Coryell – guitarist
 Marco DaSilva - multimedia artist
 Anthony Denison – actor
Mary Deyo (1887 graduate of normal school)  – missionary teacher in Japan
 James Dolan – owner of the New York Knicks, New York Rangers and Madison Square Garden; former CEO of Cablevision
 Chris Eachus – member of the New York State Assembly
 Jessica Faieta –  Assistant Administrator and Director of the Regional Bureau for Latin America and the Caribbean, United Nations Development Programme (UNDP)
 Edward Falco –  novelist and Professor of English at Virginia Tech
 Helen K. Garber – photographer
 Michael J. X. Gladis – actor
 Vinny Guadagnino –  Jersey Shore reality show actor
 Maurice Hinchey '68, M.A. '70 – member of the United States House of Representatives
 Vicky Jeudy  – actor
 Gary King – University Professor of Government at Harvard University
 Robert Kyncl –  CEO of Warner Music Group 
 Kenneth LaValle – member of the New York State Senate
 Christopher Manson – children's book author and illustrator
 Tomas Morales –  president of  California State University, San Bernardino
 Eileen Moran – visual effects producer and former executive at Weta Digital 
 Fabrizio Moretti – drummer for The Strokes
 Berhanu Nega – Ethiopian politician
 Ann Nocenti –  Marvel Comics editor; journalist
 William Parment – member of the New York State Assembly
 Andrea Peyser – New York Post columnist
 Roseann Runte –  President of Old Dominion University
 Ilyasah Shabazz – daughter of Malcolm X; writer
 Andy Shernoff – songwriter, rock musician
 Frank Skartados – member of the New York State Assembly
 Alex Storozynski – Pulitzer Prize-winning journalist
 Brianna Titone - geologist and Colorado state representative
 Aida Turturro – actress
 John Turturro – actor
 Jason West – Mayor of the Village of New Paltz, New York
 Zach Zarba – NBA official
 Kevin Zraly –   wine educator; founder of the Windows on the World Wine School

Notable faculty
 Clinton Bennett – adjunct lecturer, Religious Studies Program; authority on Islam
 Jamie Bennett – emeritus professor (1985–2015) of art
 Manuel Bromberg - professor emeritus of art
 Lew Brownstein - historian and former chair of Political Science and International Relations Department
 Arthur H. Cash (died 2016) – SUNY Distinguished Professor and professor emeritus of English; authority on Laurence Sterne
Robert Ebendorf – former professor in the metals department, starting in 1970.
 Vladimir Feltsman – University Professor, Music Department
 Heinz Insu Fenkl – professor of English; novelist, translator and folklorist
 Carol Goodman – adjunct in creative writing; novelist
Laurence M. Hauptman – Distinguished Professor of History
 Ray Huang – late professor emeritus of history; authority on the Ming dynasty; author of 1587: a Year of No Significance
 Nancy Kassop - former chair of the Political Science Department 
 Chaim Koppelman (1920–2009), American artist, educator, and Aesthetic Realism consultant
 John Langan - instructor of creative writing and gothic literature; author of horror stories, notably the Bram Stoker Award winning novel "The Fisherman"
 Joe Langworth –  adjunct, Musical Theatre
Kurt Matzdorf –  professor emeritus of goldsmithing and silversmith (working from 1957 to 1985); he founded the metals department.
 Anthony Robinson – professor emeritus of English and former director of Creative Writing Program
 Harry Schwartz – The New York Times editorial writer, Soviet specialist
 H.R. Stoneback – SUNY Distinguished Teaching Professor and professor of English; authority on Ernest Hemingway, William Faulkner, and Lawrence Durrell
William Strongin - Rabbi, author, and Professor who is currently the director of Jewish Studies

See also
 List of university art museums and galleries in New York State

References

Further reading

External links

 Official website
 Official athletics website

 
1828 establishments in New York (state)
Education in Ulster County, New York
Educational institutions established in 1828
New Paltz, New York
New Paltz, State University of New York
State University of New York at New Paltz
Tourist attractions in Ulster County, New York